The Paradelta Breathless is an Italian single-place paraglider that was designed and produced by Paradelta Parma of Parma. It remained in production in 2016.

Design and development
The Breathless was designed as a competition and cross-country glider. The models are each named for their approximate wing area in square metres.

Variants
Breathless 22
Extra small-sized model for lighter pilots.
Breathless 23
Small-sized model for lighter pilots. The glider is AFNOR certified.
Breathless 24
Mid-sized model for medium-weight pilots. The glider is AFNOR certified.
Breathless 26
Large-sized model for heavier pilots.

Specifications (Breathless 26)

References

External links

Breathless
Paragliders